The FIL European Luge Natural Track Championships 1973 took place in Taisten, Italy.

Men's singles

Women's singles

Men's doubles

Medal table

References
Men's doubles natural track European champions
Men's singles natural track European champions
Women's singles natural track European champions

FIL European Luge Natural Track Championships
1973 in luge
1970 in Italian sport
Luge in Italy
International sports competitions hosted by Italy